Rome Remains Rome is the fifth album by Holger Czukay, released in 1987 through Virgin Records. One single was released, Blessed Easter, which samples Pope John Paul II's Easter message.

Track listing

Personnel 
Musicians
Sheldon Ancel – vocals
Holger Czukay – vocals, guitar, organ, bass guitar, French horn, synthesizer, production, recording
Michael Karoli – guitar
Jaki Liebezeit – drums, trumpet, piano, percussion
Ollie Marland – guitar, piano
Jah Wobble – bass guitar, vocals
Dirk Giehmann, Peter Cremer – children's vocals ("Hit Hit Flop Flop")
Production and additional personnel
Cecilia De Medeiros – design
René Tinner – recording

References 

1987 albums
Holger Czukay albums
Virgin Records albums